Matthew Quick (born October 23, 1973) is an American writer of adult and young adult fiction. His debut novel, The Silver Linings Playbook, became a New York Times bestseller and was adapted as a movie of the same name starring Bradley Cooper and Jennifer Lawrence, with Robert De Niro, Jacki Weaver, and Chris Tucker.

Quick was a finalist for a 2009 PEN/Hemingway Award, and his work has been translated into several languages. In 2012, his young-adult novel, Boy 21, was reviewed favorably by The New York Times.

Quick was a finalist for the TIME 100 most influential people of 2013.

Personal life
Quick grew up in Oaklyn, New Jersey and graduated from Collingswood High School. He has a degree in English literature and secondary education from La Salle University and an MFA from Goddard College. Quick taught high school literature in southern New Jersey for several years, before leaving his job as a tenured English teacher in Haddonfield, New Jersey to write his first novel. Quick lived in Massachusetts for several years; he and his wife, novelist and pianist Alicia Bessette, now live on the Outer Banks of North Carolina. He received an Honorary Doctorate of Humane Letters from La Salle in 2013.

Works 
Source: Fiction Database

We Are The Light (2022) ISBN 978-1668005422, 
The Silver Linings Playbook (2008) , 
Sorta Like a Rockstar (2010) – YA  , 
Boy21 (2012) – YA , 
Forgive Me, Leonard Peacock (2013) – YA
The Good Luck of Right Now (2014)
Love May Fail (2015) , 
Every Exquisite Thing (2016) – YA
The Reason You're Alive (2017)
We Are the Light (2022)

Film adaptations 

Silver Linings Playbook (2012)
All Together Now (2020)

References

External links

 
 
 Review, The Good Luck of Right Now

1973 births
Living people
21st-century American novelists
American young adult novelists
Collingswood High School alumni
Goddard College alumni
La Salle University alumni
People from Collingswood, New Jersey
Writers from Camden, New Jersey
American male novelists
People from Oaklyn, New Jersey
21st-century American male writers
Novelists from New Jersey